Failure is the seventh studio album by avant-garde band King Missile, released on  September 15, 1998 by Shimmy Disc.

Reception

Brian Flota of AllMusic awarded Failure four out of five stars, calling its music "repulsively absurd, detailed personal attacks of venomous cynicism" that "may be as strongly worded as Jonathan Swift (read A Modest Proposal) and exaggerated as Voltaire (compare Pangloss' philosophy to track one)." Ink 19 commended the band's return to Shimmy Disc and the band's individual performances. While subtly clever at times, Failure provides no instant gratification such as "Detachable Penis," "Jesus Was Way Cool," and "certainly has its moments, but the musical noodling is distracting and there're only a few "must-have" tracks here."

Track listing

Personnel
Adapted from the Failure liner notes.

King Missile
 Bradford Reed – pencilina, piano, organ, synthesizer, drums, percussion, backing vocals, engineering, photography
 Charles Curtis – cello, guitar, backing vocals
 Sasha Forte – violin, viola, bass guitar, backing vocals, production
 John S. Hall – lead vocals, backing vocals, production

Additional performers
 Jane Scarpantoni – cello, synthesizer

Production and design
 David Bias – art direction
 Mark Kramer – production
 Sasha Forte – production
 Nancy Hall – photography
 Sascha von Oertzen – assistant engineering
 Yuriko Tada – cover art, liner notes

Release history

References

External links 
 
 Failure at Discogs (list of releases)
 Failure at iTunes

King Missile albums
1998 albums
Shimmy Disc albums
Albums produced by Kramer (musician)